Bradly Knipe (born 11 December 1998) is a track cyclist from New Zealand.

Knipe is from Invercargill on the South Island of New Zealand. Knipe won at the 2016 UCI Junior Track Cycling World Championships to become the junior sprint world champion at Switzerland in 2016, winning the gold in the individual sprint in the deciding third race over Australia's Conor Rowley. Prior to this he had won a silver in the 1000m Time Trial at the same event where he was runner up to Stefan Ritter. In January 2020 Knipe won the New Zealand national championship in the omnium. In June 2022, Knipe was named in the New Zealand sprint squad for the 2022 Commonwealth Games in Birmingham, England.

References

1998 births
New Zealand track cyclists
UCI Track Cycling World Champions (men)
Living people
New Zealand male cyclists
Cyclists at the 2022 Commonwealth Games
Commonwealth Games competitors for New Zealand
Commonwealth Games bronze medallists for New Zealand
Commonwealth Games medallists in cycling
20th-century New Zealand people
21st-century New Zealand people
Medallists at the 2022 Commonwealth Games